Kandolo is a settlement in Kenya's Eastern Province.  It is located 113 km south east of Nairobi on the Mombasa Road (A 109).

References 

Populated places in Eastern Province (Kenya)